Colonel General Alexander Ivanovich Lentsov (Russia: Александр Иванович Ленцов; born 20 December 1956), is a Russian army officer. From 1996 to 2009 he was commander of the 98th Guards Airborne Division. Between 2009 and 2013 he served as deputy commander of the Russian Airborne Forces, and from 2013 to 2020 as deputy commander of the Russian Ground Forces.

He was promoted to Lieutenant General in 2011 and Colonel General in 2014.

Since 2020 he serves as advisor to the Minister of Defence.

References

Living people
People of the annexation of Crimea by the Russian Federation
Pro-Russian people of the 2014 pro-Russian unrest in Ukraine
1956 births
Ryazan Guards Higher Airborne Command School alumni
Frunze Military Academy alumni